These are the official results of the Women's 400 metres event at the 1984 Summer Olympics in Los Angeles, California. The final was held on August 6, 1984.

Final
Held on August 6, 1984

Semifinals
Held on August 5, 1984

Round one
Held on August 4, 1984

See also
 1982 Women's European Championships 400 metres (Athens)
 1983 Women's World Championships 400 metres (Helsinki)
 1984 Women's Friendship Games 400 metres (Prague)
 1987 Women's World Championships 400 metres (Rome)

References

External links
Women's 400 metres

 
400 metres at the Olympics
1984 in women's athletics
Women's events at the 1984 Summer Olympics